The Brampton Capitals were a Junior "A" ice hockey team from Brampton, Ontario, Canada.  They were a part of the Ontario Junior Hockey League. The team was decommissioned by the league, in March 2012.

History
The team was formed as Nobleton Capitals in 1984 and later as the Etobicoke Capitals. Since moving to Brampton in 1989, the Capitals have been one of the more dominant teams in the OPJHL.  With three league titles, the Capitals have never moved on to the Dudley Hewitt Cup.

In 2000, the Capitals won their second league title, 4-games-to-2 over the Lindsay Muskies.  In 2002, Brampton won their third Buckland Trophy 4-games-to-2 against the Wellington Dukes.

Season-by-season results

Playoffs
1994 Lost Preliminary
Streetsville Derbys defeated Brampton Capitals 4-games-to-2
1995 Won League, Won OHA Buckland Cup, Won OHF Ruddock Trophy, Lost Dudley Hewitt Cup Final
Brampton Capitals defeated Burlington Cougars 4-games-to-1
Brampton Capitals defeated Streetsville Derbys 4-games-to-none
Brampton Capitals defeated Oakville Blades 4-games-to-none
Brampton Capitals defeated Barrie Colts 4-games-to-none OPJHL CHAMPIONS
First in Dudley Hewitt Cup round robin (3-0) BUCKLAND CUP, RUDDOCK TROPHY CHAMPIONS
Thunder Bay Flyers (USHL) defeated Brampton Capitals 6-4 in final
1996 Lost Final
Brampton Capitals defeated Streetsville Derbys 4-games-to-none
Brampton Capitals defeated Mississauga Chargers 4-games-to-none
Brampton Capitals defeated Bramalea Blues 4-games-to-3
Newmarket 87's defeated Brampton Capitals 4-games-to-2
1997 Lost Quarter-final
Brampton Capitals defeated St. Michael's Buzzers 4-games-to-2
Bramalea Blues defeated Brampton Capitals 4-games-to-2
1998 Lost Preliminary
Hamilton Kiltys defeated Brampton Capitals 4-games-to-1
1999 Lost Division Quarter-final
Streetsville Derbys defeated Brampton Capitals 3-games-to-2
2000 Won League, Lost OHF Ruddock Trophy and Dudley Hewitt Cup
Brampton Capitals defeated Mississauga Chargers 4-games-to-1
Brampton Capitals defeated Streetsville Derbys 4-games-to-none
Brampton Capitals defeated Georgetown Raiders 4-games-to-none
Brampton Capitals defeated Couchiching Terriers 4-games-to-none
Brampton Capitals defeated Lindsay Muskies 4-games-to-2 OPJHL CHAMPIONS
Rayside-Balfour Sabrecats (NOJHL) defeated Brampton Capitals 4-games-to-1
2001 Lost Division Final
Brampton Capitals defeated Streetsville Derbys 4-games-to-1
Brampton Capitals defeated Hamilton Kiltys 4-games-to-1
Milton Merchants defeated Brampton Capitals 4-games-to-3
2002 Won League, OPJHL withdrew from Dudley Hewitt Cup beforehand
Brampton Capitals defeated Streetsville Derbys 4-games-to-none
Brampton Capitals defeated Georgetown Raiders 4-games-to-none
Brampton Capitals defeated Hamilton Kiltys 4-games-to-2
Brampton Capitals defeated Aurora Tigers 4-games-to-none
Brampton Capitals defeated Wellington Dukes 4-games-to-2 OPJHL CHAMPIONS
2003 DNQ
2004 DNQ
2005 Lost Division Quarter-final
Hamilton Red Wings defeated Brampton Capitals 4-games-to-3
2006 Lost Division Quarter-final
Hamilton Red Wings defeated Brampton Capitals 4-games-to-none
2007 Lost Division Semi-final
Brampton Capitals defeated Milton Icehawks 4-games-to-1
Georgetown Raiders defeated Brampton Capitals 4-games-to-1
2008 Lost Division Semi-final
Brampton Capitals defeated Burlington Cougars 3-games-to-none
Georgetown Raiders defeated Brampton Capitals 4-games-to-1
2009 Lost Division Quarter-final
Oakville Blades defeated Brampton Capitals 3-games-to-none
2010 DNQ OJAHL Playoffs
2011 Lost Qualifier
Hamilton Red Wings defeated Brampton Capitals 2-games-to-1
2012 DNQ

Professional alumni
Mark Giordano
Tom Kostopoulos
Kris Newbury
Jamie Storr

External links
  

Ontario Provincial Junior A Hockey League teams
Capitals
1984 establishments in Ontario
2012 disestablishments in Ontario
Ice hockey clubs established in 1984
Sports clubs disestablished in 2012